Margaret Keitha Findlay (1916-2007) was an Australian architect.

Personal life
Margaret Keitha Findlay was born in Scottsdale, Tasmania in 1916. Then, in the 1930s, she and her family moved to New Norfolk, Tasmania, where she attended school.

Career
Upon leaving school in New Norfolk, she became an apprentice for a Hobart-based architect, A.T. Johnston while studying architecture in Hobart Technical College, which was affiliated with the Sydney Technical College. A year after finishing her apprenticeship, she worked for the Australian Newsprint Mills (ANM) Pty Ltd as an architectural draftswoman, and later after 15 months, when the ANM head architect left the company, she assumed full architectural responsibility of the New Norfolk “town-site” project which was a residential suburb for workers' families in New Norfolk where she personally designed at least 60 residential houses for ANM staff members. During her architectural teaching, she got her Diploma in Town and Country Planning from the University of Sydney where she worked and graduated in 1951. She retained her position as the head of the department until she retired in 1970.

Legacy
Findlay was the first female in Tasmania to qualify as an associate of the Royal Australian Institute of Architects (RAIA). She passed the qualification in 1943, with one other Tasmanian architect, Charles Crawford. Findlay was also the first female to be a registered architect in Tasmania. In 1944, Findlay became the first female architect employed by the Public Works Department in Tasmania and by 1945, she was selected as the Instructor in Architectural Draftsmanship at the University of Sydney, the first and only female of that position in the school.

In an interview with The Mercury in 1945, Findlay famously mentioned “never was there such an opportunity for girls to take up architecture, and this was their chance to. show the profession and the public what they could do.” Not only she opened up opportunity for Tasmanian young architects to be RAIA associate, she also formulated an architecture educational system for Hobart Technical College that qualifies students to become associates of the institute and enrolled as a registered architect under Tasmanian law after undertaking the five-year course.

Findlay also had a great interest in town planning and also mentioned that there is a great "need for town planning" Also in her interview with The Mercury (Hobart), Findlay showed her views about woman and architecture and a special emphasis on the planning of kitchens for example. "I think women architects and house-wives should have some say in the planning of the new homes." Throughout her career, Findlay stressed the importance of domestic architecture to women's health and happiness.

In 2011, Findlay was entered on the Tasmanian Honour Roll posthumously for Women for her contribution towards Architecture in Australia.

References

External links
https://web.archive.org/web/20150518081953/http://womenshistory.net.au/2012/02/22/margaret-findlay/
http://www.dpac.tas.gov.au/divisions/csrt/programs_and_services/tasmanian_honour_roll_of_women/inductees/2011/findlay,_margaret_keitha

1916 births
2007 deaths
Australian women architects
20th-century Australian architects
Tasmanian architects
20th-century Australian women
21st-century Australian women
21st-century Australian people